Valley of the Dinosaurs is an American animated television series produced by the Australian studios of Hanna-Barbera Productions and broadcast on CBS from September 7 to December 21, 1974, and in syndication from 1977 to 1983. The series, about a contemporary family sucked by a vortex back to the Stone Age was intended to be educational as well as entertaining, demonstrating the early human uses of fire, clothing, weapons and cooking. It debuted on the same day as Land of the Lost.

Plot
Science professor John Butler and his family - wife Kim, teenage daughter Katie, young son Greg, and dog Digger - are on a rafting trip along the Amazon River in an uncharted river canyon when their raft hits a rock and capsizes. They are swept through a cavern and caught in a whirlpool.

Upon resurfacing, they find themselves in a mysterious realm where humans coexist with various prehistoric creatures, including dinosaurs. The Butlers meet and befriend a clan of Neanderthal cavepeople led by Gorok, his wife Gara, their teenage son Lok, and their young daughter Tana. Gorok and his family have a pet of their own in the form of a baby Stegosaurus named Glump. Gorok's family saved the Butlers' upon their first arrival.

Gorok's family aid the Butlers' efforts to find a means of returning home. For their own part, John and his family do what they can to make the Neanderthals' daily lives easier. Examples of such included introducing Gorok's family to basic technology, such as simple machines - particularly the lever and the wheel - sailboats and windmills.

Episode list

Cast
 Frank Welker - Glump, Digger, Lok
 Melanie Baker - Tana
 Shannon Farnon - Kim Butler
 Joan Gardner - Gara
 Kathy Gori - Katie Butler
 Jackie Earle Haley - Greg Butler
 Don Messick - Narrator
 Alan Oppenheimer - Gorok
 Andrew Parks -
 Mike Road - John Butler

Comics
Charlton Comics published 11 issues of a comic book series based on the TV cartoon featuring new stories from April 1975 until December 1976. Harvey Comics published a one-shot reprint of the comics in 1993.

Home media
On March 22, 2011, Warner Archive released Valley of the Dinosaurs: The Complete Series on DVD in region 1 as part of their Hanna-Barbera Classics Collection. This is a Manufacture-on-Demand (MOD) release, available exclusively through Warner's online store and Amazon.com.

Popular culture
 Characters from the show appeared in the Harvey Birdman, Attorney at Law episode "Beyond the Valley of the Dinosaurs" with Gorok voiced by Chris Edgerly and Tana voiced by Mary Birdsong.
 Glump has a cameo in Jellystone! episode "Ice Ice Baby" voiced by Fajir Al-Kasai. He appears as Top Cat's therapy patient.

See also
 Land of the Lost - another 1974 TV series, live-action, with a similar premise.

References

External links

1970s American animated television series
1974 American television series debuts
1974 American television series endings
American children's animated action television series
American children's animated adventure television series
American children's animated science fiction television series
Animated television series about dinosaurs
Animated television series about families
CBS original programming
English-language television shows
Television series by Hanna-Barbera
Television shows adapted into comics
Lost world television series